Zbigniew Tadeusz Kaczmarek (born 31 July 1946 in Tarnowskie Góry) is a Polish former weightlifter who competed in the 1972 Summer Olympics, in the 1976 Summer Olympics, and in the 1980 Summer Olympics.

At the 1976 Summer Olympics, the first Olympics to test for anabolic steroids, he won the gold medal but tested positive for anabolic steroids and therefore disqualified for doping and was stripped of his gold medal and suspended.

References

1946 births
Living people
Polish male weightlifters
Olympic weightlifters of Poland
Weightlifters at the 1972 Summer Olympics
Weightlifters at the 1976 Summer Olympics
Weightlifters at the 1980 Summer Olympics
Olympic bronze medalists for Poland
Olympic medalists in weightlifting
Doping cases in weightlifting
Competitors stripped of Summer Olympics medals
People from Tarnowskie Góry
Polish sportspeople in doping cases
Sportspeople from Silesian Voivodeship
Medalists at the 1972 Summer Olympics
20th-century Polish people
21st-century Polish people